Traitors is the third studio album by American death metal band Misery Index. It was recorded by Kurt Ballou, mixed/mastered by Steve Wright and released through Relapse Records on September 30, 2008. A video was released for the song "Traitors".

Critical reception

Scott Alisoglu, reviewing the album for Blabbermouth.net, considered the songs on the album more varied and the songwriting better than on the preceding Discordia album, and also noted an increased sense of melody. Pitchfork Media's Cosmo Lee stated that Ballou had achieved "a sound falling somewhere between 'battering ram' and 'machine gun'", calling the album a "thought-provoking package", with lyrical themes varying from criticism of the US government to celebrity worship. According to Allmusic writer Greg Prato, the band "keep things as precise, tight, and brutal as possible from start to finish", and called the album "a complete sonic assault". The album was named "Album of the Month" by Terrorizer magazine in November 2008.

Track listing

Personnel
Adam Jarvis – drums
Mark Klöppel – guitar, vocals
Jason Netherton – bass guitar, vocals
Sparky Voyles – guitar
Guy Kozowyk – vocals ("Partisans of Grief")
Tomas Lindberg – vocals ("Ruling Class Cancelled")

Production
Kurt Ballou – engineering, recording
Drew Lamond – mixing, mastering
Steve Wright – mixing, mastering

References

2008 albums
Relapse Records albums
Misery Index (band) albums
Albums produced by Kurt Ballou